Dancing Lady is a 1933 American pre-Code musical film starring Joan Crawford and Clark Gable, and featuring Franchot Tone, Fred Astaire, Robert Benchley, and Ted Healy and His Stooges (who later became The Three Stooges with Curly, Moe and Larry). The picture was directed by Robert Z. Leonard, produced by John W. Considine Jr. and David O. Selznick, and was based on the novel of the same name by James Warner Bellah, published the previous year. The movie had a hit song in "Everything I Have Is Yours" by Burton Lane and Harold Adamson.

The film features the screen debut of dancer Fred Astaire, who appears as himself, as well as the first credited film appearance of Nelson Eddy, and an early feature film appearance of the Three Stooges – Moe Howard, Curly Howard, and Larry Fine – in support of the leader of their act at the time, Ted Healy, whose role in the film is considerably larger than theirs. The Algonquin Round Table humorist Robert Benchley plays a supporting role.

In the original film, Larry Fine completes his jigsaw puzzle only to discover to his disgust that it's a picture of Hitler. This was removed by the Production Code before the film was released to theaters, because they claimed it was an insult to a foreign head of state. The scene was restored to the TV release but not to the video release.

Plot

Janie Barlow is a young dancer who is reduced to stripping in a burlesque show. Arrested for indecent exposure, she is bailed out by millionaire playboy Tod Newton who was attracted to her while slumming at the theatre with his society pals. When she tries to get a part in a Broadway musical, Tod intercedes with director Patch Gallagher to get her the job: he will put his money into the show, if Janie is given a part in the chorus. Even though he needs the money, Patch is resistant, until he sees Janie dance and realizes her talent.

When, after hard work and perseverance, Janie is elevated to the star's part – replacing Vivian Warner – Tod is afraid he will lose any chance of gaining her affection if she becomes a star, so he closes the show, and Janie, out of work, goes away with him. Patch starts rehearsals up again using his own money, and when Janie returns and finds out that Tod has deceived her and manipulated things behind the scenes, she dumps him and joins up with her new sweetheart, Patch, to put on the show, which is a smash hit.

Cast

 Joan Crawford as Janie "Duchess" Barlow
 Clark Gable as Patch Gallagher
 Franchot Tone as Tod Newton
 May Robson as Dolly Todhunter
 Winnie Lightner as Rosette LaRue
 Fred Astaire as himself
 Robert Benchley as Ward King
 Art Jarrett as himself
 Grant Mitchell as Jasper Bradley, Sr.
 Ted Healy as Steve, Patch's assistant
 Moe Howard as Moe, a stagehand
 Curly Howard as Curly, a stagehand (credited as Jerry Howard)
 Larry Fine as Harry, a pianist
 Nelson Eddy as himself
 Maynard Holmes as Jasper Bradley, Jr.
 Sterling Holloway as Pinky
 Gloria Foy as Vivian Warner
 Eve Arden as Marcia The Southern Actress (uncredited)

Reception
Dancing Lady was a box office hit upon its release and drew mostly positive reviews from critics. Mordaunt Hall in The New York Times wrote, "It is for the most part quite a lively affair.... The dancing of Fred Astaire and Miss Crawford is most graceful and charming. The photographic effects of their scenes are an impressive achievement....Miss Crawford takes her role with no little seriousness."

Box office
According to MGM records the film earned $1,490,000 in the US and Canada and $916,000 elsewhere, resulting in a profit of $744,000.

See also
 The Three Stooges filmography

References

External links

 
 
 
 
 "Dancing Lady" at the Joan Crawford Encyclopedia

1933 films
1933 musical comedy films
1933 romantic comedy films
American musical comedy films
American romantic comedy films
American romantic musical films
American black-and-white films
Films directed by Robert Z. Leonard
Films set in New York City
Metro-Goldwyn-Mayer films
The Three Stooges films
Films produced by David O. Selznick
Films scored by Louis Silvers
1930s English-language films
1930s American films